Iran's Strongest Man (also called Mardān-e Āhanin;) is the only televised annual strongman event in Iran, airs on Channel 3. Mohammadreza Fattah Hosseini, Reza Javdani and Mohammad Amin Nabiollahi have been the host of program so far. Faramarz Khodnegah is the official referee, assisted at times by Mehdi Fatemi (2005-2006), Mehrab Fatemi (2007-2009), and Ali Dadashi (2010). After six years of absence, the 12th period of the event takes place on Nowruz 2018.

Final results

Fair-play award winner

Records

 Most champion title: 
Mehrab Fatemi (4 times)
Reza Gharaei (3 times)

 Most Runner-up title: 
Mojtaba Maleki (3 times)
Ali Esmaeili and Moslem Darabi (2 times)

 Most participation in the Final:  
Ali Esmaeili (7 times → 2005-2011)
Mohammad Mohammadi (6 times → 2005-2010)
Mehrab Fatemi (5 times → 1998, 2001, 2005-2006, 2010)
Rouhollah Dadashi (5 times → 2004, 2007-2010)

 Most consecutive wins: 
Mehrab Fatemi, Reza Gharaei, Rouhollah Dadashi, and Moslem Darabi (2 times)

References

Islamic Republic of Iran Broadcasting original programming
Iranian television series
Sport in Iran
National strongmen competitions
2000s Iranian television series
1998 Iranian television series debuts
1990s Iranian television series
2010s Iranian television series
Persian-language television shows
1998 establishments in Iran
Recurring sporting events established in 1998